Garhadiolus is a genus of Asian plants in the tribe Cichorieae within the family Asteraceae.

 Species
 Garhadiolus hamosus Boiss. & Hausskn. ex Boiss. & Hausskn. - Turkey, Iraq, Lebanon, Syria
 Garhadiolus hedypnois Jaub. & Spach - Egypt, Arabian Peninsula, Middle East, Caucasus, Cyprus, Iran, Afghanistan, Central Asia
 Garhadiolus minutissimus (Bunge) Kitam. - Jammu-Kashmir, Afghanistan, Iran
 Garhadiolus papposus Boiss. & Buhse - Xinjiang, Kazakhstan, Kyrgyzstan, Tajikistan, Turkmenistan, Uzbekistan, Afghanistan, Dagestan, Armenia, Azerbaijan, Iran, Pakistan, Iraq, Syria

 Formerly included
see Crepis 
 Garhadiolus acaulis O.Schwarz - Crepis pusilla (Sommier) Merxm.

References

External links
 Flowers of India 
 Montarano Nature Photography

Asteraceae genera
Cichorieae